Nochixtlán District is located in the southeast of the Mixteca Region of the State of Oaxaca, Mexico.
The main city is Asunción Nochixtlán.

Municipalities

The district includes the following municipalities:
 
Asunción Nochixtlán
Magdalena Jaltepec
Magdalena Zahuatlán
San Andrés Nuxiño
San Andrés Sinaxtla
San Francisco Chindúa
San Francisco Jaltepetongo
San Francisco Nuxaño
 San Juan Diuxi
San Juan Sayultepec
San Juan Tamazola
San Juan Yucuita
San Mateo Etlatongo
San Mateo Sindihui
San Miguel Chicahua
San Miguel Huautla
 San Miguel Piedras
San Miguel Tecomatlán
San Pedro Coxcaltepec Cántaros
San Pedro Teozacoalco
San Pedro Tidaá
Santa Inés de Zaragoza
Santa María Apazco
Santa María Chachoapam
 Santiago Apoala
Santiago Huauclilla
Santiago Tilantongo
Santiago Tillo
Santo Domingo Nuxaá
Santo Domingo Yanhuitlán
Magdalena Yodocono de Porfirio Díaz
Yutanduchi de Guerrero

References

Districts of Oaxaca
Mixteca Region